Jean Paul Terra Prates (born 19 June 1968) is a Brazilian lawyer, economist, environmentalist, entrepreneur and union leader and politician from the Workers' Party. He was Minority Leader of the Federal Senate from 4 February 2021 until 26 January 2023 when he resigned from the Senate to become CEO of Petrobras.

References 

1968 births
Living people
Workers' Party (Brazil) politicians
21st-century Brazilian politicians
Members of the Federal Senate (Brazil)
Brazilian businesspeople
Brazilian economists
People from Rio de Janeiro (city)
Brazilian environmentalists